Charles Stuart Mein (14 June 1841 – 30 June 1890) was a politician and judge of the Supreme Court of Queensland.

Mein was born at Maitland, New South Wales, and attended William Timothy Cape's school, at Darlinghurst until 1857, when he attended the newly opened Sydney Grammar School. He left the school as captain in 1859, and was a colleague of Samuel Griffith from 1860 to 1862 at the University of Sydney, of which he was scholar, and graduated M.A. Mein became private secretary to the Attorney-General of New South Wales, but left for Queensland in 1867, and became a solicitor of the Supreme Court three years later.

On 19 May 1876, Mein took his seat in the Queensland Legislative Council, and was appointed Postmaster-General and representative in the Council of the John Douglas Ministry on 8 July 1876. He retired with his colleagues in January 1879. In June 1884 Mein took office in the First Griffith Ministry in his former position as Postmaster-General, which he exchanged in the following January for the newly created post of Secretary for Public Instruction. In April 1885 Mr. Mein quit Parliament and the Ministry, and was appointed a Judge of the Supreme Court on the death of the late Mr. Justice Pring.

Mr. Justice Mein died on 30 June 1890 in Elizabeth Bay, New South Wales from kidney disease. His body was brought back to Brisbane
for burial at Toowong Cemetery.

References

1841 births
1890 deaths
Members of the Queensland Legislative Council
Australian solicitors
Burials at Toowong Cemetery
Colony of Queensland judges
Judges of the Supreme Court of Queensland
19th-century Australian politicians
19th-century Australian judges